The 389th Infantry Division was a German division of the Wehrmacht in the Second World War, which fought for example in the Battle of Stalingrad. It was formed on 27 January 1942 in Milowitz.

History
The 389th Infantry division was formed on 27 January 1942 as a division of the 18th mobilization wave on the training area in Milowitz near Prague. The Motto of the division was "Der Sonne Rad mit Schild und Speer, dem Rhein, dem Reich zu Wehr und Ehr".

It was designed as a "Sturm- und Stoß" division (English: storm and impulse division), whose soldiers had to run through a hard training and a long conscription to fight on the foremost part of the front. The soldiers were mostly veterans of the previous campaigns on the Western Front and the Invasion of Poland. From May 1942 onwards, it was employed in battles on the Eastern Front as a part of the 6th Army under the command of General der Panzertruppe Friedrich Paulus. After he had taken over the command in January 1942, the Red Army launched an offensive near the city of Kharkov. The German troops could repel the attack and conducted a successful counter-offensive, during which they encircled the Soviet formations. In this engagement, the Red Army sustained great casualties.

The 389th Infantry Division also participated in the German summer offensive Operation Blau, which had the aim to capture the Caucasus and Stalingrad. Stalingrad should then be used to prevent the Soviet forces from using the Volga as a supply route. The 6th Army should advance to Stalingrad. After the start of the offensive on 28 June 1942, Axis forces of Army Group B could advance quickly. By 23 August, German units reached the Volga north of the city. It was then planned that the 6th Army should encircle the Soviet 62nd and 64th Army together with 4th Panzer Army. The 4th Panzer Army started the attack regularly on 29 August. However, the 6th Army was still confronted with a Soviet counter-attack. Therefore, it could only attack 3 days later. This gave the Soviet forces to withdraw from the future pocket. During the Battle of Stalingrad, the 389th Infantry Division was the main force of the failed attack on the tractor factory. During the Soviet counter-offensive beginning under the codename Operation Uranus on 19 November 1942, the division's remnants were captured after the Axis capitulation on 2 February 1943.

The division was reformed from 17 February 1943 onwards in France. Its forces consisted of survivors and persons, who had been in furlough. In the end of September 1943, the 389th Infantry Division was redeployed on the Eastern Front, where it took part in fierce engagements in Dnjepr section causing high casualties among the division's forces. Afterwards, on 25 January, the 2nd Ukrainian Front conducted a massive attack, due to which forces of the 57th Infantry Division were sent to help the 389th Infantry Division. However, the support arrived too late and the division could just take up remnants of the 389. ID. As the 2nd Ukrainian Front then marched North, this division was pushed into the Korsun-Cherkassy Pocket.

Again, the 389. ID was reformed in Hungary in March 1944 and employed as part of Army Group North in the Kurland Pocket, where it fought until February 1945. Then, it was redeployed to Western Prussia. In the end of the war, it was captured by Soviet forces on the Hel Peninsula.

Commanders
 Generalleutnant Erwin Jaenecke (February 1942 – November 1942)
 Generalmajor Erich Magnus (November 1942 – January 1943)
 Generalmajor Martin Lattmann (January 1943 – April 1943)
 Generalmajor Erwin Gerlach (April 1943 – November 1943)
 Generalleutnant Kurt Kruse (November 1943 – March 1944)
 Generalmajor Paul Herbert Forster (March 1944 – April 1944)
 General der Infanterie Walther Hahm (April 1944 – September 1944)
 Generalleutnant Fritz Becker (September 1944 – End)

Organization
 Infanterie-Regiment 544 (Kassel)
 Infanterie-Regiment 545 (Wiesbaden)
 Infanterie-Regiment 546 (Nuremberg)
 Artillerie-Regiment 389
 I. Btl.
 II. Btl.
 III. Btl.
 IV. Btl.
 Feldersatz-Bataillon 389 - Field Replacement battalion
 Pionier-Bataillon 389 - Pioneer battalion
 Panzerjäger-Abteilung 389 - Tank hunter battalion
 Aufklärungs-Abteilung 389 - Reconnaissance battalion
 Füsilier-Bataillon 389 - Fusilier battalion
 Infanterie-Divisions-Nachrichten-Abteilung 389 - Signals battalion
 Infanterie-Divisions-Nachschubführer 389- Supply battalion

Literature
 Wilhelm Hauck, Die deutschen Infanterie-Divisionen Aufstellungsjahre 1939–1945, Band 3, 1993, Podzun- Verlag, .
 David M. Glantz: Armageddon in Stalingrad: September–November 1942 (The Stalingrad Trilogy, Volume 2). University of Kansas Press, Lawrence 2009, .
 David M. Glantz with Jonathan M. House, To the Gates of Stalingrad: Soviet-German Combat Operations, April–August 1942 (The Stalingrad Trilogy, Volume I), University of Kansas Press, Lawrence 2009, .
 Florian von und zu Aufsess, Die Anlagenbänder zu den Kriegstagebüchern der 6. Armee, Band I, Selbstverlag Schwabach 2006
 Florian von und zu Aufsess, Die Anlagenbänder zu den Kriegstagebüchern der 6. Armee, Band II, Selbstverlag Schwabach 2006
 Florian von und zu Aufsess, Die Anlagenbänder zu den Kriegstagebüchern der 6. Armee, Band III, Selbstverlag Schwabach 2006
 Janusz Piekalkiewicz, Stalingrad, Anatomie einer Schlacht, 4. Auflage, Heyne-Verlag München 1992, 
 Armeeoberkommando 6, Kriegstagebuch Nr. 12 vom 23. Mai - 19. Juli 1942, Bundesarchiv -Militärarchiv Freiburg-, RH 20-6/176
 Armeeoberkommando 6, Kriegstagebuch Nr. 13 / 1. Band vom 20. Juli - 26. August, Bundesarchiv -Militärarchiv Freiburg-, RH 20-6/198

Infantry divisions of Germany during World War II
Military units and formations established in 1942
Military units and formations disestablished in 1945